This timeline of Ordovician research is a chronological listing of events in the history of geology and paleontology focused on the study of earth during the span of time lasting from 485.4–443.4 million years ago and the legacies of this period in the rock and fossil records.

18th century

1780s
1789
 Bruguière described the new genus Orthoceras

20th century

1970s
1978
 Lindström, Maurits, described the earliest known octocoral in Sweden shifting the first known appearance from the Cretaceous to the Ordovician.

21st century

2010s
2015
 Van Roy, Daley, and Briggs described the new genus and species Aegirocassis benmoulae.

See also

 History of paleontology
 Timeline of paleontology
 Timeline of Cambrian research
 Timeline of Silurian research
 Timeline of Devonian research
 Timeline of Carboniferous research
 Timeline of Permian research

References

Ordovician
Ordovician